Bastian Steel Bukan Cowok Biasa is an Indonesian soap opera musical comedy drama produced by SinemArt that airs daily on RCTI. The story is a loose adaptation of the Harry Potter story.

Cast

Main cast
 Anjab Habibi as Bastian
 Cut Syifa as Jelita
 Bryan Domani as Guntur

Supporting cast 
 Hanggini as Flora
 Randy Martin as Rommy
 Qaidi Rozan as Dudung
 Beby Natalie as Tamara
 Emmanuel Sylla as Dion
 Idrus Madani as Abdullah
 Sultan Djorghi as Abad
 Qubil AJ as Yanto
 Vonny Cornelia as July
 Yadi Timo as Fuad
 Enno TB as Yuni
 Melissa Grace as Melissa
 Nunu Datau as Yasmin
 Sultan Sudradjat as Vito
Angela Tee as Tiara

Music is provided by Bastian Bintang Simbolon.

References

External links 
  Bastian Steel Bukan Cowok Biasa at Website SinemArt
  Sinopsis Bastian Steel Bukan Cowok Biasa at Website channel RCTI rcti.tv

2014 Indonesian television series debuts
2014 Indonesian television series endings
Indonesian drama television series
Indonesian television soap operas
RCTI original programming
Works based on Harry Potter
2010s high school television series
Indonesian comedy television series
Musical television soap operas
Witchcraft in television
2010s Indonesian television series
2010s television soap operas